Aluvere is a village in Sõmeru Parish, Lääne-Viru County, in northeastern Estonia.

References
 

Villages in Lääne-Viru County